Bill Butler (1933 – 4 June 2017) was an English film editor. He was known for editing A Clockwork Orange (1971), for which he was nominated for the Academy Award for Best Film Editing. Other notable films edited by Butler include Buona Sera, Mrs. Campbell (1968), A Touch of Class (1973) and The Duchess and the Dirtwater Fox (1976), all directed by Melvin Frank. He died in Sherman Oaks, California in 2017. A Clockwork Orange was listed as the 40th best-edited film of all time in a 2012 survey of members of the Motion Picture Editors Guild.

References

External links

English film editors
1933 births
2017 deaths
Place of birth missing